Note: There exists a duplicate article (which does not include the world champion), under the title of 2013 Little League Intermediate World Series.

The 2013 Intermediate League World Series took place from July 30–August 5 in Livermore, California, United States. Osaka, Japan defeated Collier Township, Pennsylvania in the championship game. 

This was the inaugural ILWS.

Teams

Results

United States Bracket

International Bracket

Consolation round

Elimination Round

References

Intermediate League World Series
Intermediate League World Series